Parallel bars are floor apparatus consisting of two wooden bars slightly over  long and positioned at roughly head height. Parallel bars are used in artistic gymnastics and also for physical therapy and home exercise. Gymnasts may optionally wear grips when performing a routine on the parallel bars, although this is uncommon.

Apparatus 
The apparatus consists of two parallel bars that are held parallel to, and elevated above, the floor by a metal supporting framework. The bars are composed of wood or other material, with an outer coating of wood. The vertical members of the supporting framework are adjustable so the height of the bars above the floor and distance between the bars can be set optimally for each gymnast.

Dimensions 
Bar length:  ± 
Bar rounded profile:  ±  vertical by  ±  horizontal 
Bar width:  ± 
Height of bar from floor:  ± 
Distance between bars:   –  (adjustable)

History
The parallel bars (in German Barren) were invented by Friedrich Ludwig Jahn in Berlin. In 1819 the first transportable parallel bars were described. In 1856 in Germany Hermann Otto Kluge used tubes to make the parallel bars and the horizontal bar adjustable. He used them in his gym. In Tolstoy's Anna Karenina, published between 1873–1877, their use for exercise is described.

Routines 
A routine performed on the parallel bars must include various elements that depend on the gymnast's competitive level. A typical performance will involve swinging skills in a support position (on the hands), a hanging position, and an upper arm position (resting on the inner bicep). Also, parallel bar routines often feature a strength or static hold skill such as an L-sit or handstand. Each routine ends with a dismount from either the ends of the bars or the side of the apparatus.

International level routines 
A parallel bar routine should contain at least one element from all element groups:
 I. Elements in support or through support
 II. Elements starting in upper arm position
 III. Long swings in hang, on 1 or 2 bars and Underswings
 IV. Dismounts

Scoring and rules 
Deductions are taken for lack of form and precision of elements performed.  There are specific deductions for adjusting hand position in handstand and not controlling swing elements; swing type elements should momentarily show handstand.

See also

 Parallettes

External links

References

Sports originating in Germany
Artistic gymnastics apparatus
German inventions
1819 in sports